Cranes Today is an international monthly trade magazine for the crane and lifting industries, published by World Market Intelligence. It was first published in November 1972 and has been recognised as the leading journal for the crane industry. 

Cranes Today'''s annual Middle East Cranes conference has been running since 2007, and is held in Dubai in association with a number of crane companies and associations. 

The inaugural Cranes Asia conference is to take place in Singapore from 9–10 December 2009 Cranes Today publishes its Fleet File every summer, usually in the June edition. Fleet File is a database of who owns what in the crane industry. In 2009 it included entries from 500 companies owning more than 38,000 cranes in 50 countries.

References

 External links 
 Cranes Today magazine
 Cranes Marketplace Cranes Marketplace was launched on 13 August 2009 by Cranes Today''

Business magazines published in the United Kingdom
Monthly magazines published in the United Kingdom
Magazines established in 1972
Professional and trade magazines